Ramón Massó Tarruella (1928 - 2017) was a Spanish media and communications expert and a former Carlist politician.

Early life and education

Ramón Massó Tarruella was born to an established, much branched and well-to-do Catalan bourgeoisie family. His grandfather, Ramón Massó Marcer, originated from the small seaside town of Sant Pere de Ribes. In 1885, during rapid expansion of the Catalan clothing manufacturing, he moved to Barcelona to set up his own business; he started a company specializing in dyes for the textile industry (his cousin, Ramón Oliveras Massó, became an academic and taught chemistry in the Barcelona-based Escuela de Ingenieros Industriales until 1936). His son, Juan Massó Soler, entered the family business in 1912 and developed it into a successful chemical company. Member of many Catalan commercial and trade institutions, he married Nuria Tarruella Riu.

The couple had 8 children, 3 sons (José Luis, Ramón, Juan Antonio) and 5 daughters (Montserrat, Isabel, Maria Amelia, Pilar and Nuria), all raised in a profoundly Catholic and traditional ambience. In the 1950s José Luis and Juan Antonio got engaged in the family company and later turned it into Comercial Química Massó Sociedad Anónima, which expanded into new market sectors and remains active until today. In the early 1960s Juan Antonio left the family enterprise and commenced studying canon law, ordained as a priest in 1965; following his transfer to Australia he later became head (Regional Vicar) of Opus Dei there, the position retained until his death.

As a child Ramón together with his family fled Barcelona, the city which fell under the anarchist control during the first months of the Civil War. The family settled in San Sebastián in the nationalist zone. The Massó boys joined Pelayos, the Carlist organization for older children animated mostly by the Catalan emigres, but terminated their engagement following amalgamation of the Carlist and Falangist juvenile organizations; as a kid Massó took part in the 1937 anti-unification demonstrations, allegedly shouting "death to Franco" and "death to Falange". Following the end of hostilities the family returned to Barcelona, where Ramón together with his brothers became a teenage member of the Catalan Opus Dei.

In late 1940s Massó moved to Madrid studying Filosofia y Letras to graduate in Philosophy (later he became also Técnico en Publicidad). During his university years he joined Agrupación de Estudiantes Tradicionalistas, a technically illegal though tolerated Carlist student organization. Enraged by increasing marginalization of Carlism within the political realm of the regime he developed his childish anti-Falangist sentiments into a firm anti-Francoist outlook. Engaged in leafleting campaigns and skirmishes against the official SEU organization, in 1954 Massó (recommended by the Carlist political leader Manuel Fal Conde) grew to the position of Delegado Nacional of AET.

Aspiring Carlist

Massó was increasingly disappointed by the perceived somnolent atmosphere of the movement's circulos, with the older generation trapped in recollections of the long gone days of glory. Highly emotional semi-clandestine 1956 attempts to dissuade the Carlist claimant from a would-be dynastical union with the Alfonsinos and to inspire him towards a decisive policy proved unsuccessful. The Massó-led aetistas, upset with the diffident Don Javier, decided to focus on his eldest son Carlos Hugo, with whom the group found common ground during his brief stay in Madrid en route to Portugal in 1955.
 
Carlos Hugo, at that time a French citizen completing PhD in economics in Oxford, threw himself into the Spanish politics in liaison with Massó and his team. Following half a year spent quietly in Bilbao on improving his castellano and learning Spanish politics (his key tutor Massó just commenced teaching at the local Colegio Gaztelueta), the prince made a public debut during the annual Carlist amassment at Montejurra in May 1957. The entry, repeatedly rehearsed, meticulously planned and pre-agreed with the Carlist leadership, turned out to be a masterpiece of public appearance. The unexpected prince's presentation generated exploding enthusiasm of the crowd, excited by youth, optimism and royal firmness of the speaker (though the lecture contained only one reference to God and included phrases sounding like an offer to Franco). Massó and his team ensured that La Proclama de Montejurra gets propagated in the Carlist circulos across Spain. In 1958 Carlos Hugo's speech – again carefully crafted by the prince, Massó and the team – called for profound change, put social issues on the forefront and contained a positive reference to Franco. During the following years the snowballing attendance at Montejurra transformed it from a Carlist-flavored local Via Crucis to the largest (save official, religious and football gatherings) public amassment in Francoist Spain. 

The emergence of Carlos Hugo and the hugocarlistas coincided with the overall change in the Carlist strategy towards Francoism; in 1955 the intransigent Fal Conde was replaced as the movement's leader by a collective governing body, which initiated a new collaborative policy. Tactically Massó also opted for limited collaboration with Francoism (which cost him AET leadership in 1957), judging that gaining room for action is vital for his further aims.  However, while the new Carlist leader José María Valiente sincerely hoped for some sort of prudent partnership between Francoism and Carlism, Massó aimed at dismantling the regime from within. Moreover, while Valiente oriented himself towards the army and bureaucracy, the hugocarlistas approached the hardcore syndicalist Falange sector, likewise promoting new social order and disdainful towards greedy capitalism.

The collaborative approach appeared to work: in the early 1960s the Carlists were granted a few media and organizational concessions. The hugocarlistas benefited the most, opening a number of new periodicals turned into their ideological tribunes (mostly Azada y asta and Montejurra), galvanizing the chain of Círculos Culturales Vázquez de Mella and launching their own workers' organization, MOT, all of them becoming later dissemination channels of their political vision.

Protagonist Carlist

As Carlos Hugo moved to Madrid he organized the young collaborators, dubbed camarilla and headed by Massó, into his Secretaría Política. The partnership of the old and the young leaders seemed smooth, though some of the former started suspecting the latter of dangerously Leftist ideas. Backed by the aging claimant the hugocarlistas assumed more powers as the newly established Junta de Gobierno diluted the authority of Valiente. Massó outplayed the chief opponent, José Luis Zamanillo, marginalized him in 1962–1963 and finally got him expelled early 1964. From this moment on the hugocarlistas spelled out their vision of Carlism more openly; the same year they published Esquema doctrinal, a lecture which avoided open challenge to Francoism and presented a monarchist corporative political organization combined with anti-capitalist and democratic principles. During the 1965 Montejurra the hugocarlistas voiced their praise of socialism and even Marxism at unprecedented levels.

It is not clear whether Massó intended to instaurate the Carlist dynasty by means of new social mobilization or he tried to promote profound transformation using Carlos Hugo as an agent of change; anyway, the two threads became intertwined. The immediate political objective of Massó was to prevent the Alfonsist restoration. The young Carlists dogged the juanista niño, boycotting or jeering Juan Carlos; they publicly humiliated the royal prince and his wife a few times. At the same time, Massó engineered a campaign to promote Carlos Hugo across the country. The operation revealed much understanding of the media role in the consumer society, as it exploited common tabloid threads and kept feeding the press with new scoops (the prince as a miner in Asturias, at a parachute course, at Sanfermines) and taking advantage of charm and youth of the prince's three sisters. The efforts proved fairly successful, as in the tightly censured media the Borbon-Parmas gained sort of nationwide positive recognition.

The greatest scoop came in 1964, when Carlos Hugo married princess Irene of the Netherlands. At this point, however, the regime propaganda machine was firmly ordered to backtrack. Franco, though personally delighted that the Dutch royal family (one of the harshest critics of his regime) was publicly humiliated by a Spanish royal hopeful, grew increasingly anxious that the popularity of Carlos Hugo might get him cornered when it comes to an inescapable dynastical decision. Despite wide TV coverage across Western Europe the Spanish media played down the event, which marked hard limits of Massó's strategy and got him bitterly disappointed.

In mid-1960s Massó realized that his strategy had failed; moreover, he realized that Leftist phraseology (with socialismo and autogestión most prominent catchwords) had divided and debilitated Carlism. In 1965 he loosened his ties with Carlos Hugo by moving from Madrid to Pamplona, where he commenced teaching at the Opus Dei university. As opposition against his influence mounted from the orthodox Traditionalist camp of Valiente and from the militantly Leftist group of José Ma Zavala, in 1966 Massó ceased as head of Secretaría Política; in 1967 he and some of his collaborators handed their resignations and withdrew from politics. He remained loosely related to Carlism, e.g. shortly before death taking part in historical conference,

Media pundit and academic

In late 1960s Massó settled in Pamplona, working as an academic teacher at Instituto de Estudios Superiores de la Empresa (IESE), a prestigious business school founded by Opus Dei back in 1958. It was there that he completed the Alta Dirección curriculum himself, a holistic leadership program offered to top corporate managers. Finally disillusioned with Opus Dei and with its role during the process of installing Juan Carlos as the future king of Spain, Massó broke with the organization and moved to Barcelona. In his native city he joined Universidad Autónoma de Barcelona (UAB), where he became catedratico in Departamento de publicidad at the Facultad de Ciencias de la Información.

Massó's small booklet Estrategia para unas extrañas elecciones (1977) earned him local media recognition  and triggered co-operation with La Vanguardia; he became its key politics and public affairs commentator (until 1984). Massó experienced most of the Spanish transition to democracy not as a protagonist but as a witness, periodically having a regular column in the Sunday issue. As a press pundit he was careful to remain within the limits of political science and styled himself as an unbiased scholarly observer, though his hostility to Francoism and support for reforms remained evident. In general opposed to sectarian politics, he occasionally kept referring to Lenin as a political authority. His commentary suggested also that Massó sort of put up with the royal function of Juan Carlos and with his role in the Spanish transition. In late 1970s together with his former Carlist collaborator José Antonio Parilla he engaged in the Nono Art publishing house and co-ordinated work on a popular series Breu História de Catalunya (1979–81).

Communication expert

In mid-1970s Massó co-founded Alas, one of the first media agencies in Spain and became head of its Barcelona branch. About the same time he launched the term "politing", intended as a merger of "politics" and "marketing" and meant as a specialized knowledge (if not a science itself) on the crossroads of social sciences, public relations and politics. His work Introducción al “politing”. Lanzamiento de un aspirante (1976), apart from gaining official prizes (Premio Markedit, Premio Instituto Nacional de Publicidad), generated also significant interest among the academics, politicians and commentators.  The book was formatted as a systematic theoretical lecture on the basics of political marketing, though it contained many explicit and implicit references to the 1957–1967 political experiences of the author. Relative success of launching Carlos Hugo became one of Masso's key credentials as a scholar in public relations and as a businessman running commercial (he claims authorship of La Caixa brand) and social (e.g. cancer awareness) media campaigns. He followed with another book, De la magia a la artesanía: el politing del cambio español  (1980), becoming a nationwide recognised scholar and giving courses organised by Sociedad Española de Anunciantes, Instituto Nacional de Publicidad or Escuela Oficial de Radio y Television.

In the 1990s Massó switched his focus to media with El exito de la cultura light: Anuncios y noticias (1993) and Noticias frente a hechos: Entender la realidad despues de leer los periodicos (1997). Later on he broadened his interest into the wider realm of public communication, focusing on combined multidimensional holistic forms and channels of information exchange named "integral communication". He co-founded the Barcelona-based Institut de Comunicació Integral, an independent college specializing in marketing, brand communications and public relations, and became its president. ICOMI turned out to be a commercial (though not necessarily scientific) success and became a fashionable educational institute (incorporated into Universidad Abad Oliva CEU in 2003). During the last decade Massó published successive books on culture, communications and politics: Otro rey para España: crónica del lanzamiento y fracaso de Carlos Hugo (2004), Los últimos días de la Telecracia (with Enrique Nebot, 2009), Nacimiento y muerte de las marcas (with Joaquín García-Lavernia Gil, 2010), Navegando por el cachondeo de la historia (2012) and even a children's book, La segunda vida de Don Jos Kintana (1999). He maintaied Twitter and Facebook accounts, scarcely active during last years of his life.

Reception

In the 1990s, looking back on his political past, Massó admitted defeat at the hands of a competitive group of Machiavellian players coming from the same Opus Dei hotbed (especially López Rodó), who outplayed him by dismantling Francoism with technocratic strategy and with Juan Carlos as a better marketed and better designed version of Carlos Hugo. He denied charges that he had implanted Marxism within the Carlist realm; he rather pointed to the Juan Vázquez de Mella heritage, based on sociedalismo and the concept of organic society.
 
In historiography Massó remains a rather divisive and ambiguous figure, with little agreement as to his role and intentions. Some historians (Payne, Bartyzel) maintain that he unleashed forces which either destroyed Carlism or turned it into its own antinomy. Some historians (Clemente, Martorell Pérez) claim that he helped to safeguard Carlist identity or at least contributed to emphasizing genuine Carlism and sidetracking its accidental threads.  Some historians (MacClancy, Caspistegui Gorasurreta) suggest that he commenced the process of redirecting Carlism from traditional and orthodox path to a new formula. Some historians (Perez-Nievas) do not consider Massó worth mentioning and present de Zavala as the leader of the group.

According to one group of studies (Martorell Pérez, MacClancy) Massó was primarily motivated by dynastical objectives, according to another (Clemente) he was not a monarchist at all. There are scholars (Bartyzel) who consider him a radical Leftist approximate to Marxism, there are others (Clemente) who consider him a "neocapitalist technocrat". Certain works (Martorell Pérez, in line with Masso's own later narration) present Carlos Hugo as a politician invented and created by Massó, certain works (Clemente) present Massó as Carlos Hugo's sidekick, useful at one political phase and to be replaced at the following one. Massó's departure from politics is explained by failure of his policy (Martorell Pérez), by Carlos Hugo's decision to replace him (Clemente), by his alleged falling in love with one of Carlos Hugo's sisters (Fraga), by pressure from Opus Dei (Lavardín), by combined efforts of enemies from the Right like Valiente and from the Left like de Zavala (Pérez Madrigal) or by pure greed (Zabala).

One thing most historians agree on is that Massó proved instrumental in dismantling Traditionalist Carlism (though they do not agree whether a non-Traditionalist Carlism can actually exist). None of the currently operating Carlist grouplets admits deference to Massó. Traditionalists (carloctavistas, sixtinos, CTC) tend to view him as a turncoat, the progressives (Partido Carlista, javierocarlistas) tend to view him as merely a former fellow-traveller.

Before death he dedicated his future corpse to scientific research, and hence there was no funeral arranged and there is no grave. His death was acknowledged on few websites related to Partido Carlista, though not by major Spanish media.

See also

 Carlism
 Carlos Hugo, Duke of Parma
 Francoism
 Communication
 Mass media
 Models of communication
 Popular culture studies

References

 Jacek Bartyzel, Don Carlos Marx, Wroclaw 2011, 
 Josep Carles Clemente, Joaquín Cubero Sánchez, Don Javier: una vida al servicio de la libertad, Barcelona 1997, 9788401530180
 Josep Carles Clemente, Historia del Carlismo contemporaneo 1935–1972, Barcelona 1977, 9788425307591
 Francisco Javier Caspistegui Garasurreta, El naufragio de las ortodoxias.
 Javier Lavardín [José Antonio Parilla], Historia del ultimo pretendiente a la corona de España, Paris 1976
 Jeremy MacClancy, The Decline of Carlism, Reno 2000, 
 Jeremy MacClancy, Aspectos de la evolución carlista durante el franquismo, [in:] Mito y realidad en la historia de Navarra : ponencias del IV Congreso de Historia de Navarra Congreso de Historia de Navarra, Pamplona 1998, vol. pp. 205–216
 Jeremy MacClancy, An anthropological approach to carlist ritual: Montejurra during francoism, [in:] Violencias fraticidas. Jornadas de Estudio del Carlismo, Estella 2009, pp. 299–322
 Jeremy MacClancy, GAC, Militant Carlist Activism, 1968–1972, [in:] Essays in Basque social Anthropology and History Reno 1989, 9781877802027, pp. 177–185
 Manuel Martorell Pérez, La continuidad ideológica del carlismo tras la Guerra Civil [PhD thesis], Valencia 2009
 Stanley G. Payne, Historia del carlismo, Madrid 1995
 Fermín Pérez-Nievas Borderas, Contra viento y marea.

External links
 Quimica Massó site
 John Masso foundation 
 IESE site
 sisters of Carlos Hugo (late 1950s photo)
 a sample of Massó's press commentary (1978)
 1964: Irene, Carlos, romance and the fascist country video
 Irene and Carlos Hugo wedding video
 a book on "politing" on books.google
 Los Últimos días de la telecracia at mediafire
 Massó on Carlos Hugo and Falange in 2002
 
 

1928 births
2017 deaths
Academic staff of the Autonomous University of Barcelona
Businesspeople in advertising
Carlists
Businesspeople from Catalonia
Philosophers from Catalonia
Politicians from Catalonia
Critical theorists
Communication scholars
Communication theorists
Marketing theorists
Mass media scholars
Opus Dei members
Writers from Barcelona
Spanish businesspeople
Spanish essayists
20th-century Spanish historians
Spanish mass media people
Spanish monarchists
Spanish male writers
Spanish refugees
Spanish Roman Catholics
Theorists on Western civilization
Writers about globalization
Male essayists